Glyphipterix argyroguttella is a moth of the  family Glyphipterigidae. It is found in France, Italy and Russia.

The wingspan is about 18 mm.

Subspecies
Glyphipterix argyroguttella argyroguttella
Glyphipterix argyroguttella paurographella Ragonot, 1885 (Italy)

References

Moths described in 1885
Glyphipterigidae
Moths of Europe